Li Tianyou (1914–1970) was a general (shangjiang) of the Chinese People's Liberation Army.

Biography 
Born to a poor peasant family in Lingui, Guangxi, Li joined the Chinese Communist Party in 1929, at the age of 15, and in November of that year participated in the Baise Uprising. 

He took part in the Long March (where he earned a reputation as a reckless military leader due to his intentional sacrifice of his entire division, even though that bought more time for the Communist forces to retreat from the pursuing KMT forces) and then fought in both the Second Sino-Japanese War and the Chinese Civil War. In the meantime, from 1938 to 1944 he lived in the Soviet Union, and graduated from the Soviet Frunze Military Academy.

He was Lin Biao's chief of staff during the Chinese Civil War, and, among other actions, led Communist forces to victory in the Battle of Siping.

During the Korean War, he commanded the PVA 13th Army which defeated the UN forces in northwestern Korea.

From 1962 until his death in 1970, he served as Deputy Chief of the PLA General Staff, with overall responsibility for Operations.

He died in 1970, at the age of 56, due to chronic illness.

References

1914 births
1970 deaths
Chinese communists
Chinese military personnel of the Korean War
Chinese military personnel of World War II
Eighth Route Army personnel
Frunze Military Academy alumni
People of the Chinese Civil War
Commanders of the Guangzhou Military Region
People's Liberation Army generals from Guangxi
People from Guilin